Cephalothrix is a genus of nemerteans belonging to the family Cephalothricidae.

The genus has cosmopolitan distribution.

Species

Species:

Cephalothrix adriatica 
Cephalothrix alba 
Cephalothrix aliena

References

Palaeonemertea
Nemertea genera